The 2016 elections for the Oregon Legislative Assembly determined the composition of both houses for the 79th Oregon Legislative Assembly. The Republican and Democratic parties held primary elections on May 17, 2016 with general elections on November 8.

The Democratic Party maintained its 35-25 advantage in the Oregon House of Representatives while losing one seat in the Oregon State Senate to bring their advantage to 17-13 over the Republicans.

Oregon Senate
In the previous session, the Democrats held an 18-12 majority over the Republicans. The 16 seats up for election included 8 seats previously held by Republicans, and 8 by Democrats.

Open seats
In District 3, incumbent Democrat Kevin Talbert, who was appointed in August to replace the deceased Alan Bates decided not to seek election.
In District 21, incumbent Democrat and President Pro Tempore Diane Rosenbaum retired.
In District 22, incumbent Democrat Chip Shields retired.
In District 28, incumbent Republican Doug Whitsett retired.

Results

Oregon House of Representatives

All 60 seats of the Oregon House of Representatives were up for re-election, being represented by 35 Democrats and 25 Republicans. The Democrats expanded their 34-26 advantage to 35-25 in the 2014 election.

Open seats
In District 1, incumbent Republican Wayne Krieger retired.
In District 5, incumbent Democrat Peter Buckley retired.
In District 14, incumbent Democrat Val Hoyle contested the Democratic primary for Secretary of State. 
In District 22, incumbent Democrat Betty Komp retired.
In District 24, incumbent Republican Jim Weidner retired.
In District 26, incumbent Republican John Davis retired.
In District 27, incumbent Democrat Tobias Read retired to run for Oregon State Treasurer.
In District 30, incumbent Democrat Joe Gallegos retired.
In District 40, incumbent Democrat Brent Barton retired.
In District 41, incumbent Democrat Kathleen Taylor retired to contest the District 21 Senate seat held by Diane Rosenbaum.
In District 43, incumbent Democrat Lew Frederick retired to contest the District 22 Senate seat held by Chip Shields.
In District 47, incumbent Democrat Jessica Vega Pederson retired to run for Multnomah County Commissioner.
In District 51, incumbent Democrat Shemia Fagan retired.
In District 56, incumbent Republican Gail Whitsett retired.

Results

Maps

See also
78th Oregon Legislative Assembly (2015-2016)
79th Oregon Legislative Assembly (2017-2018)

References

2016 Oregon elections
Oregon Legislative Assembly elections
Oregon legislative